Blepharochalasis is an inflammation of the eyelid that is characterized by exacerbations and remissions of eyelid edema, which results in a stretching and subsequent atrophy of the eyelid tissue, leading to the formation of redundant folds over the lid margins. It typically affects only the upper eyelids, and may be unilateral as well as bilateral.

Signs and symptoms

Complications
Complications of blepharochalasis may include conjunctival hyperemia (excessive blood flow through the moist tissues of the orbit), chemosis, entropion, ectropion, and ptosis.

Causes
Blepharochalasis is idiopathic in most cases, i.e., the cause is unknown. Systemic conditions linked to blepharochalasis are renal agenesis, vertebral abnormalities, and congenital heart disease.

Pathophysiology
Blepharochalasis results from recurrent bouts of painless eyelid swelling, each lasting for several days. This is thought to be a form of localized angioedema, or rapid accumulation of fluid in the tissues. Recurrent episodes lead to thin and atrophic skin. Damage to the levator palpebrae superioris muscle causes ptosis, or drooping of the eyelid, when the muscle can no longer hold the eyelid up.

Diagnosis

Differential diagnosis
Dermatochalasis is sometimes confused with blepharochalasis, but these are two different conditions.

Treatment
The following procedures have been described for blepharochalasis:
 External levator aponeurosis tuck
 Blepharoplasty
 Lateral canthoplasty
 Dermis fat grafts
These are used to correct atrophic blepharochalasis after the syndrome has run its course.

Epidemiology
It is encountered more commonly in younger rather than older individuals

References

External links 

Abnormalities of dermal fibrous and elastic tissue
Disorders of eyelid, lacrimal system and orbit